Zahra Marwa is a Lebanese Poet and journalist. She has three anthologies of poems, these are; “A Ready Paradise”, “Residence in Prelude” and “Life in Installments”. Moreover, Marwa is a member in Shahriad Cultural Group, a salon that host Lebanese and Arab poets in Hamra Street every Tuesday. Furthermore, some of her poems had translated into German. The Lebanese poet and critic, Michal Saade, wrote a book about her poems titled “Zahra Marwa in her works “A Ready Paradise“ and “Residence in Prelude”: a critical constructive  study”. Every now and then, Marwa translates famous poets’ works from French to Arabic.

Early life and education 
Zahra Marwa was educated in a convent school for girls, and she started writing her journals in a very early age. By time, she started writing texts that are close to poem and she majored in business administration.

Career 
Zahra Marwa wrote her first poem after the death of one of her relatives, she wrote a poetic text expressing her grief of her father's death. By then, she was only eighteen years old, but she later stated in a press interview that writing actually tuned down her grief. Afterwards, she published that poem in a cultural.

Zahra Marwa published a book “Life in Installments”, by Iraqi Rawsem press. The book was a collection of free and condensed poems tackling absence, loss and loneness, and simultaneously carried many deep thoughtful questions that urge the reader into deep thinking about the simplest things.

In 2012, the Arabic Press for Science published her book “Residence in Prelude” in about 80 pages9.. In the book, Marwa wrote love poems that included poetic images in which she tried to tackle feelings as she later stated the book included 67 prose and poem texts for example; those who cross over have the right in refection”, “The Hour of Poem”, “To the road”10, “Taking his Glory”, “Becoming beautiful”, “we met” and “limitless”.

In early 2012, Marwa published the novel of “A Ready Paradise” by Al-Ghawoon Press; that is, a short novel not more than 48 pages. The book was considered a poem collection more than a novel. Moreover, Marwa collected within the book a series of short poems written in a certain comprehensive narration in terms of storytelling, criticism, commentator, description and recital. Furthermore, the collection included 37 titles of both poem and prose mainly; 11 “The Upside-down Tree”, “the Nullity and the Gold”, “A moon in my hand”, “A hanging Leap”, “A little man”, “Labor”, “The Nightmares of one evening” and “A safe”.

One of the recent works of Marwa  is the novel “Napoleons’ letter to Josephine” within the section of Letters’ literature by Rafedeen Press for Publications and distribution in the year 2021 in 312 pages. In that book, the writer tackled the subject of love letters in the international literature, especially the letters of Napoleon. In addition, Marwa translated these letters. Those love letters sent by Napoleon to the woman he loved at first sight; Josephine. Further, Marwa introduced to the Arab world, Josephine, whose real name was Rose Tacher. Tacher was a widow of a general who was execute during the French revolution, escaped the guillotine by the help of some of her powerful friends, found herself a young widow and a mother of one young man, Eugene and a one daughter “Herotance”. Besides a title and a huge legacy of her late husband, until Napoleon fell in love with her. Marwa said that the book contained the literature of Correspondence that does not repeat easily as a rare incident that crosses a person once in a lifetime.

Reviews 
A great poet masters manipulating words and meanings and knows the secret of interweaving a poem, which means to enter the kitchen. Marwa believes that a poet should follow the poem during its labor's stages as a great poet also reads and follows the poetic experiments of his/ her time. Similarly, other ages, while emphasizing that a person who writes poems should be reliable and passionate and should read poetry and critics of his/ her time and could easily become a critic.

Marwa thinks that e- books enable promoting poets and their production. Yet, she warns of e- hijacking and recommending writers to search the topic and make enquires in that aspect in order to protect their work and themselves.

Works list:        

This is a list of the main works of the Lebanese writer and poet Zahra Marwa

·     A Ready Paradise

·     Residence in Prelude

·     Life in Installments

References 

Lebanese writers